Michael W. Connolly (born October 31, 1945) was the Iowa State Senator from the 14th District. He served in the Iowa Senate 1989 – 2008 and was an assistant majority leader.

Education
He received his B.A. and M.A. from Loras College.

Career
Connolly spent 30 years in the public service, 10 of which were spent in the Iowa House and 20 years in the Iowa Senate. Connolly served on several committees in the Iowa Senate - the Appropriations committee; the Education committee; the Ways and Means committee; the Ethics committee, where he was vice chair; the Government Oversight committee, where he was vice chair; the State Government committee, where he was chair and the Transportation committee, where he was chair.  He served in the Iowa House of Representatives 1979 – 1989.

Connolly ran unopposed for re-election in 2004, receiving 21,685 votes.  He was not a candidate for reelection in 2008.

References

External links
Iowa General Assembly - Senator Mike Connolly official government website
Project Vote Smart - Michael W. 'Mike' Connolly profile
Follow the Money - Mike Connolly
2006 2004 2002 2000 1998 campaign contributions
Iowa Senate Democrats - Mike Connolly profile

Democratic Party Iowa state senators
Democratic Party members of the Iowa House of Representatives
1945 births
Living people
Loras College alumni
Politicians from Dubuque, Iowa